, is an action game for the PlayStation 2. This game is based on the popular Japanese live-action TV series Space Sheriff trilogy produced by Toei Company. This series helped the Metal Heroes genre to grow popular in Japan in the '80s. The Space Sheriff trilogy was quickly exported in European countries, such as France since 1982 (the series was renamed X-OR), Asia (including Indonesia, Malaysia and most notably Philippines)  and Latin America (Brazil). The game was simultaneously released on May 25, 2006 in Japan, Hong Kong and Taiwan. Weekly Famitsu rated it 21/40.

Kenji Ohba and Hiroshi Watari reprised their roles as Gavan and Sharivan, respectively. Takuo Kawamura took over as the voice of Shaider, as Hiroshi Tsuburaya died in 2001.

Story
Gavan Mode
TV series based
The Space Sheriff Spirits Mode
The crossover 1984 TV special based + original elements

Game modes (translation)

Gavan Mode
Play as Retsu Ichijoji (Gavan), and as Kojiro Aoyama in two stages, in this story mode based on the Space Sheriff Gavan TV series. The plot is followed by stills taken from the most important episodes. The player has the ability to pick up and throw items in this game mode.
Mission 1 (episode 1 of the series)
Mission 2 (quick summarize of episode 13, based on episode 14)
Mission 3 (episode 24)
Mission 4 (quick summarize of episode 30, based on episode 31)
Mission 5 (episode 39.. mini game without battle at all)
Mission 6 (episode 42)
Mission 7 (episodes 43, 44 (final))

Uchū Keiji Tamashii Mode (extra)
Opening
Mission 1
Mission 2
Mission 3
Mission 4A / Mission 4B
Mission 5A / Mission 5B
Staff Roll

Battle Royale Mode
In this Versus mode, the user selects one of the playable characters, within the heroes side, and fights against a CPU controller villain in a single-round deadly fight. Small variations are offered in this mode, like the ability to select an ally or, to fight versus either a single or a couple of enemies. The player has the ability to pick up and throw items in this game mode too.
1P vs CPU2
1P vs CPU2 + CPU3
1P + CPU1 vs CPU2
1P + CPU1 vs CPU2 + CPU3

Survival Mode (extra)
The player select one, of the five available characters, and have to defeat 999 villains, including bosses appearing in the Gavan Mode. CPU controlled allies from the two story modes will briefly join the fight and help the player. Exceptionally, this mode is a single-stage one, located on the parallel world, also no items can be used by the player. Beating this mode will unlock videos in the Omake Mode.
Retsu Ichijoji (Gavan)
Den Iga (Sharivan)
Dai Sawamura (Shaider)
Alan
Annie

Omake Mode
This theater mode contains five unlockable original TV commercials broadcast in Japan in the '80s. An extra "Making of 宇宙刑事魂" 2006 footage is also selectable once unlocked.
Gavan action figure 006P, Popy, TV commercial (unlockable)
Dolgiran ship DX, Popy, TV commercial (unlockable)
Sharivan action figure + Crime Burster gun, Bandai, TV commercial (unlockable)
Sharingar Tank radio control, Characon/Bandai, TV commercial (unlockable)
Shaian tank DX + Bluhawk bike, Popynika/Bandai, TV commercial (unlockable)
Making of The Space Sheriff Spirits, behind the scenes featurette (unlockable)

Option
Memory card (PS2): Load・Save
Autosave function: Off・On
Vibration function: Off・On
Game difficulty: Easy・Normal・Hard
Key assign type: Type A・Type B
Music volume: Low<->High
Sound effects volume: Low<->High
Custom settings: Default・Custom

Characters

Playable
Gavan Mode
Retsu Ichijoji (Gavan)
Kojiro Aoyama
Alan
Uchū Keiji Tamashii Mode
Retsu Ichijoji (Gavan)
Den Iga (Sharivan)
Dai Sawamura (Shaider)
Annie
Battle Royale Mode
Retsu Ichijoji
Gavan
Vario Zector (unlockable)
Den Iga (unlockable)
Sharivan (unlockable)
Alan (unlockable)
Dai Sawamura (unlockable)
Shaider (unlockable)
Annie (unlockable)
Survival Mode
Retsu Ichijoji (Gavan)
Den Iga (Sharivan)
Dai Sawamura (Shaider)
Alan
Annie

Non-playable
Battle Royale Mode
Shako Monster
Double Man
Sai Doubler
Saber Doubler
Saimin Doubler (unlockable)
Buffalo Doubler (unlockable)
San Dorva (unlockable)
Kiba the Witch (unlockable)
Black Sai Doubler (unlockable)
Black Saber Doubler (unlockable)
Hunter Killer (unlockable)
Great Emperor Kubilai (unlockable)
Demon King Psycho (unlockable)
Don Horror (unlockable)
Dark Galaxy Queen (unlockable)
Commander Qom (unlockable)

Voice cast
Kenji Ohba - Retsu Ichijoji/Gavan
Wakiko Kano - Mimi
Hiroshi Watari - Den Iga/Sharivan
Takuo Kawamura - Dai Sawamura/Shaider
Naomi Morinaga - Annie
Hiroshi Miyauchi - Alan/Space Sheriff Alan
Toshiaki Nishizawa - Commander Kom
Masayuki Suzuki - Kojiro Aoyama
Shōzō Iizuka - Don Horror/Psycho/Kubhirai
Michiro Iida - Hunter Killer/Vario Zector
Noboru Mitani - Kiba the Witch/Majou Kiba
Ken Nishida - Sun Dolba
Machiko Soga - Dark Galaxy Queen/Honey/Mitsubachi Doubler (Double Girl)

External links
The Space Sheriff Spirits official website

2006 video games
Action video games
PlayStation 2 games
PlayStation 2-only games
Japan-exclusive video games
Metal Hero Series
Tokusatsu video games
Video games about police officers
Video games developed in Japan